Through a Window is the seventh album by Patrick Sky, recorded in 1985.

Track listing

Side A
1." San Francisco Bay Blues"
I'll never forget Jesse Fuller playing his Foot-Della [sic] (a string-bass operated by the foot) at the Gaslight in New York. He played a 3-hour set and had to be dragged offstage.
2. "Ramblin' Boy"
Tom Paxton's best.
3. "Separation Blues"
My own contribution. I'm told it's a popular camp song.
4. " Dark as a Dungeon"
Although this song was written much earlier it was important to me when I was involved in raising money for the Hazard miners. There is no better mining song.
5. Mississippi John Hurt's "Candy Man"
His style of fingerpicking influenced me more than any other player. Candy Man — what a metaphor!
6.  "Blowin' in the Wind"
When this song first hit the airwaves it shocked everyone. The anthem of the sixties.

Side B
1. Reverend Gary Davis "Candy Man"
The Reverend's style of fingerpicking along with Merle Travis' set the standard.
2. ""Don't Think Twice"
The great Dylan song was heavily influenced by our mutual friend, Paul Clayton — collector and singer; his logging camp songs were gems.
3. "Ballad of Ira Hayes"
The plight of the Native Americans was never more poignantly expressed.
4. "Freight Train"
Is there anyone who plays a guitar that does not know Libba Cotten's Freight Train?
5. "Louise"
Paul Siebel still remains one of my favorite songwriters.
6.  "Good Night Irene"
I'll never forget the first time I heard Ledbelly [sic] on the 12 string guitar. I ran to a pawn shop and bought an old plywood 'Harmony". Later I used it for a planter.

Personnel
Patrick Sky - vocal, acoustic guitar 
Michael Shorrock - bass 
Laura Furlong - fiddle 
Ted Bird - harmonica
Technical
Produced, supervised, recorded and engineered by Patrick Sky — Skylark Productions. 
Assistant Engineer: Ray Noren 
Graphics: Cathy Sky 
Photos: Ray Clayton

References

1985 albums
Patrick Sky albums